Kushkuak (Quşqıwaq) is a rural locality (a village) in Safarovsky Selsoviet, Chishminsky District, Bashkortostan, Russia. The population was 53 as of 2010. There is 1 street.

Geography 
Kushkuak is located 19 km southwest of Chishmy (the district's administrative centre) by road. Udryak is the nearest rural locality.

References 

Rural localities in Chishminsky District